Rathard  is a ringfort (rath) and National Monument located in County Limerick, Ireland.

Location

References

Archaeological sites in County Limerick
National Monuments in County Limerick